The GE 45-ton switcher is a 4-axle diesel locomotive built by General Electric between 1940 and 1956.

Equipment
The locomotive was equipped with two  Cummins diesel engines, each driving a GE 1503 generator which, in turn, drove one of the two GE 733 traction motors, one per truck. In early models, the second axle on each truck was driven with side rods.  Later models had chain drives inside the trucks that served the same purpose.

A traditional train air brake was optional, but all came with two compressors (one per engine) and a straight-air independent (locomotive) brake.  The cabs were spacious for the size of the locomotive. Both the engineer's and fireman's seats were raised almost two feet on platforms (under which was the brake equipment, if applicable), to provide better visibility during switching.

Uses
The GE 45-ton was extremely versatile and many variants existed.  It has a high weight to power ratio and has excellent traction, rated to be able to pull 20 loaded freight cars on level track. They were built with a short wheelbase for use in industrial plants, yards, and other places where clearances were tight.  Although intended as switchers, they sometimes served mainline duties, although nearly all had an imposed speed limit of  due to the double reduction gearing of their traction motors.

Preserved Examples
Alberni Pacific Railway, The Alberni Pacific Railway in Port Alberni, BC Canada has one GE 45 Tonner thats used as a backup locomotive for their Heritage Railway operations over six miles of track from downtown Port Alberni to McLean Mill National Historic Site. The locomotive was orignially built for the US Army in 1942 and later retired working for MacMillian Bloedel Ltd at their railwyard in Port Alberni, BC.
American Railcar Industries Inc., The railcar repair facility in Tennille, Georgia has one GE 45 Tonner that's used to switch their yard and to move railcars into and out of their repair shop. It is painted light blue with a white cab roof and black trucks. It has a white ARI company logo but has no number.
Catskill Mountain Railroad, The in Kingston, NY has an early side rod 45 Tonner in service as both an MOW engine and a pusher for Polar Express and other large event consists.
East Terminal Railway, The in Columbus, Ohio acquired one of these locomotives in August 2021, with plans to restore it to full operation and to use it as its primary service unit.
Edmonton Transit also uses one of these locomotives, numbered 2010, for MOW tasks. 
Escanaba and Lake Superior Railroad, The operates the former White Pine Copper no 1 45-ton and uses it as their car shop switcher, alternating with other diesel locomotives.
Fox River Trolley Museum, The of South Elgin, IL operates the Aurora, Elgin & Fox River Electric Company no. 5
Henry Ford Greenfield Village, The operates the former Naval Weapons Station Charleston No. 1, previously located at the base outside of Goose Creek, South Carolina. It is used to shuttle supplies for their steam locomotives from the Canadian National tracks to the village rails.
Lake Superior And Mississippi railroad, The of Duluth, Minnesota owns and operates one. 
Lake Superior Railroad Museum, The has a former Minnesota Power 45-ton, which is now used for switching rolling stock around the museum. 
National Steel Car Limited in Hamilton Ontario currently owns four of these engines. Two are inactive, and two are used for moving all cars throughout the plant.
Nevada Northern Railway, The owns one and is currently restoring it.
North Carolina Transportation Museum, The operates North Carolina Ports Authority 45-ton No. L3 
Newport and Narragansett Bay Railroad, The operates two of these locomotives on a regular revenue basis.
Railroad Museum of New England, The / Naugatuck railroad owns a side-rod equipped 45-tonner which was built in 1942 (#15807) for the Rohm & Haas Chemical Co. as #RH-1. Donated 1993 by Cold Metal Products, it was repainted orange by RMNE and numbered 42, for its year of construction. Currently, the locomotive is stored out of service.
Richmond Railroad Museum, The, operated by the Old Dominion Chapter, National Railway Historical Society, owns one that is located at its Hallsboro Yard site west of Richmond, Virginia. It was built in 1946 and purchased by the East Washington Railway in September of that year. It was retired in 1970 and sold to the Pinto Islands Metals Company in Mobile, Alabama, and for decades had been the plant switcher at the James River Cogeneration Company in Hopewell, VA. The plant was retired in 2019 and, following the plant's closing, the locomotive was acquired by the Richmond Railroad Museum. The locomotive itself was transported from the plant to the museum's satellite yard in Hallsboro, Virginia.
Rochester & Genesee Valley Railroad Museum, The has restored former Rochester Gas & Electric 1941, a unit originally used by GE at River Works in Lynn, MA. It was donated to the museum in 1991 by Rochester Gas and Electric. 
Sioux City Railroad Museum, The owns and operates a former US Marine Corps 45-ton locomotive, painted in a Milwaukee Road paint scheme and numbered to #206.
Railstar Corp. at Lowville, NY owns one in preparation of a tourist railroad startup. 
Southeastern Railway Museum, The operates a 50 ton ballasted unit built for the Anglo-Canadian Paper Company and which was later Hudson Bay Mining no. 101
Southeastern Pennsylvania Transportation Authority, The (SEPTA) has one numbered LM-2 used as a maintenance of way (MOW) and rescue locomotive for its Broad Street subway line. 
South Carolina Railroad Museum, The has No 82, a side-rod 45-ton, built for and used at Naval Shipyard Charleston, South Carolina, prior to going to the museum. It is currently being restored to full operation. 
The Delta Valley and Southern 50 is listed on the National Register of Historic Places. Its present location is unknown. 
Texas Transportation Museum, The operates the former USAF 7071 45-ton and uses it on regular train rides, alternating with its other diesel locomotive.
Walkersville Southern Railroad, The uses two as its primary service units, plus it acquired a third in 2021 that is presently under restoration. Number 4 (ex-USA 8538) and No. 9 (ex-USN 65-00439) are owned by Jamie Haislip and No. 45 (ex-US Army 7496)) is owned by Al Leyh, both volunteers on the WS.

Gallery

References

45-ton switcher
B-B locomotives
Diesel-electric locomotives of the United States
Railway locomotives introduced in 1940
Standard gauge locomotives of the United States